Suresh Heblikar is a Kannada filmmaker, director and actor.

Life
He is also a environmentalist, founding the Eco-Watch NGO in 1998. He has produced many movies in Kannada of which Kadina Benki won Best Director national award and Usha Kiran the Filmfare award. His films are known to have an offbeat theme where "passionate romance" is portrayed.

Filmography

See also
Sunil Kumar Desai

References

External links
 Chitraranga profile

Indian male film actors
Male actors in Kannada cinema
Kannada film producers
Male actors from Karnataka
Living people
Kannada film directors
1948 births
People from Dharwad
Film producers from Karnataka
20th-century Indian male actors
21st-century Indian male actors
Karnatak University alumni